Aldershot Town Football Club, a professional association football club based in Aldershot, Hampshire, England, was founded in 1992 after the closure of debt-ridden Aldershot Football Club.

Key

Key to positions and symbols
  = Champions
  = Runners-up
  = Promoted
  = Relegated
  = Qualified for the play-offs

Key to rounds
QR = Qualifying round
QR1 = First qualifying round, etc.
R1 = First round, etc.
QF = Quarter-finals
SF = Semi-finals
RU = Runners-up
W = Winners

Seasons

Notes

References

Seasons
 
Aldershot Town F.C.